Communist Workers Organisation may refer to:

Communist Workers' Organisation (UK), the British section of the Internationalist Communist Tendency
Communist Workers Organisation (Marxist–Leninist)
Communist Workers Organisation (Netherlands)